Buzz is a Polish airline headquartered in Warsaw. Formerly called Ryanair Sun, it is a subsidiary of the Irish airline company Ryanair Holdings and a sister airline to Ryanair, Ryanair UK, Malta Air and Lauda Europe.

Formed in 2017 and initially positioned as a charter airline without any scheduled services, Buzz operates scheduled flights on behalf of Ryanair, and charter flights in its own right, out of Poland. In March 2019, Ryanair announced that Ryanair Sun would be rebranded as Buzz in autumn 2019. Buzz commenced operations in January 2020.

History

Initial operations as charter airline 
On April 3, 2018, the carrier received an air operator's certificate granted by the Polish Civil Aviation Authority. It started operations on 23 April 2018 and the first flight took place on 26 April 2018, on the route from Poznań–Ławica Airport to Zakynthos International Airport. In Poznan and Wroclaw the carrier will use the infrastructure of already existing bases, while in Katowice and Warsaw new ones were created.

Representatives of the carrier announced that all five aircraft in the Ryanair Sun fleet would receive Polish registration numbers. During summer 2018, Ryanair Sun operated one own Boeing 737-800 registered as SP-RSA. The aircraft was employed on charter flights from Warsaw-Chopin.

Operations on behalf of Ryanair mainline 
In September 2018 Ryanair announced the closure of its own Polish bases by 1 January 2019. Operations were to be transferred to Ryanair Sun, meaning Ryanair Sun would operate on behalf of its parent company. In late October 2018, the then-only Ryanair Sun aircraft SP-RSA ceased charter operations out of Warsaw Chopin. The aircraft subsequently replaced Ryanair mainline capacity out of Warsaw Modlin, now operating scheduled services on behalf of its parent company. Starting from November 2018, several former Ryanair-operated Boeing 737 were moved from the Irish to the Polish registry and now operated by Ryanair Sun on behalf of its parent companies scheduled flights out of Poland.

Rebranding: Buzz 
In March 2019, Ryanair announced that the airline would be rebranded Buzz in autumn 2019. Buzz was the name of a UK budget airline Ryanair bought from KLM in April 2003. Buzz will still operate scheduled and charter flights from its bases in Poland, Czechia, and Bulgaria and aims to expand its fleet from 17 Boeing 737-800s to 25 by summer 2019.

Fleet
, the Buzz fleet consists of the following aircraft:

See also
 Buzz (airline)
 Ryanair Flight 4978

References

External links

Airlines of Poland
Airlines established in 2018
Charter airlines
Polish companies established in 2018
Ryanair